Cadejé Airstrip  is a private dirt airstrip located In Cadejé, 13 km North of San Juanico, Municipality of Comondú, Baja California Sur, Mexico. The airstrip is used solely for general aviation purposes. This airstrip is an alternative to the San Juanico airstrip (located on the Scorpion Bay coast), which remains closed. The letters CDJ are used as an identifier code. This airstrip is also known by government officials as "La Vinatería".

External links
Info about Cadejé Airstrip

Cadeje Airport is an airport that is maintained by the Aeromedico group from Santa Barbara. Cadeje Airport is not open to the public. Aeromedicos are a non-profit medical and dental group that serves the surrounding area.
La Vinateria is another airport 50 miles south, at the town of La Purisima.

Airports in Baja California Sur
Comondú Municipality